This is a list of several past and present personalities on the ESPNU network.

Current

Announcers, reporters and hosts
Dave Armstrong: (play-by-play, 2005–present) ESPNU College Football 
Rece Davis: (host, 2005–present) Honor Roll
Mike Gleason: (host and play-by-play, 2005––present) SportsCenterU and ESPNU College Football Primetime 
Clay Matvick: (host, reporter and play-by-play, 2006–present) ESPNU College Football and ESPNU College Basketball
Chris Spielman: (host, 2006–present) Summer HouseLisa Salters: (reporter, 2008–present) ESPNU Reporter
Ian Darke: (play-by-play, 2010–present) ESPNU Play-By-Play
Joe Davis: (play-by-play, 2012–present) ESPNU Play-By-Play
Jaymee Sire: (reporter, 2013–present) ESPNU Reporter
Mark Jones: (host, 2006–present) ESPNU Host
Anish Shroff: (host, 2005–present) ESPNU Host SportsCenterU
Carter Blackburn: (reporter, 2006–present) ESPNU Reporter
Mike Crispino: (reporter, 2005–present) ESPNU Reporter
Craig Custance: (reporter, 2012–present) ESPNU Reporter
Bob Wischusen: (play-by-play, 2006–present) ESPNU Play-By-Play

College hockey
Barry Melrose: (analyst, 1993–present) ESPNU College Hockey
Colby Cohen: (analyst, 2016–present) ESPNU College Hockey

College football
Lee Corso: (analyst, 2003–present) ESPNU College Football
Mike Tomczak: (analyst, 2005–present) ESPNU College Football 
Jay Walker: (analyst, 2005–present) ESPNU College Football PrimetimeTodd McShay: (analyst, 2005–present) ESPNU Inside the PollsCharles Arbuckle: (analyst, 2005–present) ESPNU College Football Primetime 
David Diaz-Infante: (analyst, 2005–present) ESPNU College Football Primetime 
Chris Martin: (analyst, 2006–present) ESPNU College Football Primetime 
Brian Kinchen: (analyst, 2006) ESPNU College Football 
Mike Adamle: (play-by-play, 2005–present) ESPNU College Football PrimetimeDesmond Howard: (analyst, 2005–present) ESPNU College Football

College baseball
Mark Mulder: (analyst, 2011–present) ESPNU College Baseball
Tom Luginbill: (analyst, 2006–present) SportsCenterU and ESPNU Recruiting Insider and ESPNU College Baseball
John Kruk: (analyst, 2003–present) ESPNU College Baseball
Doug Glanville: (analyst, 2011–present) ESPNU College Baseball

College basketball
Jay Bilas: (analyst, 2003–present) ESPNU College Basketball
Dick Vitale: (analyst, 1985–present) ESPNU College Basketball
Digger Phelps: (analyst, 2000–present) ESPNU College Basketball
Jalen Rose: (analyst, 2007–present) ESPNU College Basketball
Andy Katz: (analyst, 2005–present) ESPNU College Basketball
Tim Legler: (analyst, 2003–present) ESPNU College Basketball
Jon Barry: (analyst, 2003–present) ESPNU College Basketball
Mark Adams: (analyst, 2003–present) ESPNU College Basketball
Tim Welsh: (analyst, 2003–present) ESPNU College Basketball
Adrian Branch: (analyst, 2006–present) ESPNU College Basketball

Former
Colin Cowherd: (host, 2008–2015) ESPNU Host
Mike Gottfried: (analyst, 2005–) ESPNU Inside the Polls and ESPNU College Basketball
Mike Hall: (host, 2005–2007) SportsCenterU, ESPNU Recruiting Insider, ESPNU Inside the Polls and ESPNU Coaches SpotlightWayne Larrivee: (play-by-play, 2005) ESPNU College FootballKelly Stouffer: (analyst, 2005) ESPNU College Football Primetime 
Howie Schwab: (reporter, 2005–2013) ESPNU Reporter
Randy Walker: (analyst, 2005) ESPNU College Football''

References
ESPNtv.com – The People

ESPN people